Liopinus mimeticus is a species of beetle in the family Cerambycidae. It was described by Casey in 1891.

References

Acanthocinini
Beetles described in 1891